John Walker Shill (January 12, 1913 — October 25, 1976) was a Canadian ice hockey forward who played 6 seasons in the National Hockey League for the Toronto Maple Leafs, Boston Bruins, New York Americans and Chicago Black Hawks from 1933 to 1939. He won the Stanley Cup in 1938 with Chicago.

Life and career
In 1936 Jack was #97 in the O-Pee-Chee line of trading cards.

While playing for the Boston Bruins in 1942 he was part of the "New Kid Line" alongside Don Gallinger and Bep Guidolin. He wore sweater #9 in Boston.

His Toronto Maple Leaf sweater was #1, while he wore #3 for the Chicago Black Hawks.

Prematurely balding, Jack's nickname in the NHL was "Snowball". His brother Bill also played in the NHL. Many of his neighbours became NHL stars including Lionel Conacher who had nearby Cotingham Park renamed in his honour.

Jack was born in Toronto, Ontario and married to Margaret Loreen Jeffrey and had one daughter, Joanne Shill. After retirement from hockey he worked for the City of Toronto. Both Jack and Margaret died in 1976 and are buried at Mt. Pleasant Cemetery, Toronto.

Career statistics

Regular season and playoffs

Awards and achievements
1938  Stanley Cup  Championship  (Chicago)

References

External links

1913 births
1976 deaths
Boston Bruins players
Boston Cubs players
Canadian expatriate ice hockey players in the United States
Canadian ice hockey left wingers
Chicago Blackhawks players
New York Americans players
Ontario Hockey Association Senior A League (1890–1979) players
Providence Reds players
Ice hockey people from Toronto
Stanley Cup champions
Syracuse Stars (IHL) players
Toronto Maple Leafs players
Toronto Marlboros players